Hånes Church is a parish church of the Church of Norway in Kristiansand Municipality in Agder county, Norway. It is located in the district of Hånes in the borough of Oddernes in the eastern part of the city of Kristiansand. It is the church for the Hånes parish which is part of the Kristiansand domprosti (arch-deanery) in the Diocese of Agder og Telemark. The white, concrete church was built in a rectangular design in 1986 using plans drawn up by the architect Arild Lauvland. The church seats about 200 people.

The church was founded in 1986. In 2004, the church was expanded to include several more office spaces. In 2010, the sanctuary was renovated.

See also
List of churches in Agder og Telemark

References

External links

Churches in Kristiansand
20th-century Church of Norway church buildings
Churches completed in 1986
1986 establishments in Norway